Methylol urea is the organic compound with the formula H2NC(O)NHCH2OH. It is a white, water-soluble solid that decomposes near 110 °C. 

Methylolurea is the product of the condensation reaction of formaldehyde and urea.  As such it is an intermediate in the formation of urea-formaldehyde resins as well as fertilizer compositions such as methylene diurea. It has also been investigated as a corrosion inhibitor.

References

Ureas